The 2017 Engie Open Saint-Gaudens Occitanie was a professional tennis tournament played on outdoor clay courts. It was the twenty-first edition of the tournament and part of the 2017 ITF Women's Circuit, offering a total of $60,000 in prize money. It took place in Saint-Gaudens, France, from 15–21 May 2017.

Point distribution

Singles main draw entrants

Seeds 

 1 Rankings as of 8 May 2017

Other entrants 
The following players received wildcards into the singles main draw:
  Audrey Albié
  Tessah Andrianjafitrimo
  Victoria Muntean
  Eden Silva

The following players received entry into the singles main draw by a junior exempt:
  Rebeka Masarova

The following players received entry from the qualifying draw:
  Amandine Hesse
  Alexandra Panova
  Teliana Pereira
  Jessika Ponchet

The following player received entry by a lucky loser:
  Storm Sanders

Champions

Singles

 Richèl Hogenkamp def.  Kristie Ahn, 6–2, 6–4

Doubles

 Chang Kai-chen /  Han Xinyun def.  Montserrat González /  Sílvia Soler Espinosa, 7–5, 6–1

External links 
 2017 Engie Open Saint-Gaudens Occitanie at ITFtennis.com
 Official website 

2017 in French tennis
2017 ITF Women's Circuit
Open Saint-Gaudens Occitanie